Queens Plaza may refer to:

 Queens Plaza (Queens) in Queens, New York, U.S.
 Queens Plaza (IND Queens Boulevard Line), an underground station
 QueensPlaza, a shopping centre in Brisbane, Queensland, Australia

See also 
 Queensboro Plaza (New York City Subway), an elevated station at Queens Plaza in New York City
 Queensboro Bridge, the bridge between Manhattan and Queens which feeds into Queens Plaza in New York City
 Queens (disambiguation) for other places named "Queens" or "Queen's"